Pixels per inch (ppi) and pixels per centimetre (ppcm or pixels/cm) are measurements of the pixel density of an electronic image device, such as a computer monitor or television display, or image digitizing device such as a camera or image scanner. Horizontal and vertical density are usually the same, as most devices have square pixels, but differ on devices that have non-square pixels. Note that pixel density is not the same as where the former describes the amount of detail on a physical surface or device, the latter describes the amount of pixel information regardless of its scale. Considered in another way, a pixel has no inherent size or unit (a pixel is actually a sample), but when it is printed, displayed, or scanned, then the pixel has both a physical size (dimension) and a pixel density (ppi).

Basic principles 
Since most digital hardware devices use dots or pixels, the size of the media (in inches) and the number of pixels (or dots) are directly related by the 'pixels per inch'. The following formula gives the number of pixels, horizontally or vertically, given the physical size of a format and the pixels per inch of the output:

Pixels per inch (or pixels per centimetre) describes the detail of an image file when the print size is known. For example, a 100×100 pixel image printed in a 2 inch square has a resolution of 50 pixels per inch. Used this way, the measurement is meaningful when printing an image. In many applications, such as Adobe Photoshop, the program is designed so that one creates new images by specifying the output device and PPI (pixels per inch). Thus the output target is often defined upon creating the image.

Outputting to a different device 
When moving images between devices, such as printing an image that was created on a monitor, it is important to understand the pixel density of both devices. Consider a 23″ HD monitor (20″ wide), that has a known, native resolution of 1920 pixels (horizontal). Let us assume an artist created a new image at this monitor resolution of 1920 pixels, possibly intended for the web without regard to printing. Rewriting the formula above can tell us the pixel density (PPI) of the image on the monitor display:

Now, let us imagine the artist wishes to print a larger banner at 48″ horizontally. We know the number of pixels in the image, and the size of the output, from which we can use the same formula again to give the PPI of the printed poster:

This shows that the output banner will have only 40 pixels per inch. Since a printer device is capable of printing at 300 ppi, the resolution of the original image is well below what would be needed to create a decent quality banner, even if it looked good on a monitor for a website. We would say more directly that a 1920 × 1080 pixel image does not have enough pixels to be printed in a large format.

Printing on paper 
Printing on paper is accomplished with different technologies. Newspapers and magazines were traditionally printed using a screen called a halftone screen, which would print dots at a given frequency called the screen frequency in lines per inch (LPI) by using a purely analog process in which a photographic print is converted into variable sized dots through interference patterns passing through a screen. Modern inkjet printers can print microscopic dots at any location, and don't require a screen grid, so they use a metric called dots per inch (DPI). These are both different from pixel density or pixels per inch (PPI) because a pixel is a single sample of any color, whereas an inkjet print can only print a dot of a specific color either on or off. Thus a printer translates the pixels into a series of dots using a process called dithering. The dot pitch, smallest size of each dot, is also determined by the type of paper the image is printed on. An absorbent paper surface, uncoated recycled paper for instance, lets ink droplets spread — so has a larger dot pitch.

Often one wishes to know the image quality in pixels per inch (PPI) that would be suitable for a given output device. If the choice is too low, then the quality will be below what the device is capable of—loss of quality—and if the choice is too high then pixels will be stored unnecessarily—wasted disk space. The ideal pixel density (PPI) depends on the output format, output device, the intended use and artistic choice. For inkjet printers measured in dots per inch it is generally good practice to use half or less than the DPI to determine the PPI. For example, an image intended for a printer capable of 600 dpi could be created at 300 ppi. When using other technologies such as AM or FM screen printing, there are often published screening charts that indicate the ideal PPI for a printing method.

Using the DPI or LPI of a printer remains useful to determine PPI until one reaches larger formats, such as 36" or higher, as the factor of visual acuity then becomes more important to consider. If a print can be viewed close up, then one may choose the printer device limits. However, if a poster, banner or billboard will be viewed from far away then it is possible to use a much lower PPI.

Computer displays 
The PPI/PPCM of a computer display is related to the size of the display in inches/centimetres and the total number of pixels in the horizontal and vertical directions. This measurement is often referred to as dots per inch, though that measurement more accurately refers to the resolution of a computer printer.

For example, a 15-inch (38 cm) display whose dimensions work out to 12 inches (30.48 cm) wide by 9 inches (22.86 cm) high, capable of a maximum 1024×768 (or XGA) pixel resolution, can display around 85 PPI, or 33.46PPCM, in both the horizontal and vertical directions. This figure is determined by dividing the width (or height) of the display area in pixels by the width (or height) of the display area in inches. It is possible for a display to have different horizontal and vertical PPI measurements (e.g., a typical 4:3 ratio CRT monitor showing a 1280×1024 mode computer display at maximum size, which is a 5:4 ratio, not quite the same as 4:3). The apparent PPI of a monitor depends upon the screen resolution (that is, the number of pixels) and the size of the screen in use; a monitor in 800×600 mode has a lower PPI than does the same monitor in a 1024×768 or 1280×960 mode.

The dot pitch of a computer display determines the absolute limit of possible pixel density.
Typical circa-2000 cathode ray tube or LCD computer displays range from 67 to 130 PPI, though desktop monitors have exceeded 200 PPI, and certain smartphone manufacturers' flagship mobile device models have been exceeding 500 PPI since 2014.

In January 2008, Kopin Corporation announced a 0.44 inch (1.12 cm) SVGA LCD with a pixel density of 2272 PPI (each pixel only 11.25μm). In 2011 they followed this up with a 3760-DPI 0.21-inch diagonal VGA colour display. The manufacturer says they designed the LCD to be optically magnified, as in high-resolution eyewear devices.

Holography applications demand even greater pixel density, as higher pixel density produces a larger image size and wider viewing angle. Spatial light modulators can reduce pixel pitch to 2.5 μm, giving a pixel density of 10,160 PPI.

Some observations indicate that the unaided human generally can't differentiate detail beyond 300 PPI. However, this figure depends both on the distance between viewer and image, and the viewer’s visual acuity.  The human eye also responds in a different way to a bright, evenly lit interactive display from how it does to prints on paper.

High pixel density display technologies would make supersampled antialiasing obsolete, enable true WYSIWYG graphics and, potentially enable a practical “paperless office” era. For perspective, such a device at 15 inch (38 cm) screen size would have to display more than four Full HD screens (or WQUXGA resolution).

The PPI pixel density specification of a display is also useful for calibrating a monitor with a printer. Software can use the PPI measurement to display a document at "actual size" on the screen.

Calculation of monitor PPI 

PPI can be calculated from knowing the diagonal size of the screen in inches and the resolution in pixels (width and height). This can be done in two steps:

 Calculate diagonal resolution in pixels using the Pythagorean theorem, then the actual PPI:

where
  is width resolution in pixels
  is height resolution in pixels
  is diagonal size in inches (this is the number advertised as the size of the display).

For example:
 For 15.6 inch screen with a 5120×2880 resolution you get  = 376.57 PPI.
 For 50 inch screen with a 8192×4608 resolution you get  = 188 PPI.
 For 27 inch screen with a 3840×2160 resolution you get  = 163 PPI.
 For 32 inch screen with a 3840×2160 resolution you get  = 138 PPI.
 For an old-school 10.1 inch netbook screen with a 1024×600 resolution you get  = 117.5 PPI.
 For 27 inch screen with a 2560×1440 resolution you get  = 108.8 PPI.
 For a 21.5 inches (546.1 mm) screen with a 1920×1080 resolution you get  = 102.46 PPI;
Note that these calculations may not be very precise. Frequently, screens advertised as “X inch screen” can have their real physical dimensions of viewable area differ, for example:
 Apple Inc. advertised their mid-2011 iMac as a "21.5 inch (viewable) [...] display," but its actual viewable area is 545.22 mm or 21.465 inches. The more precise figure increases the calculated PPI from 102.46 (using 21.5) to 102.63.
 The HP LP2065 20 inch (50.8 cm) monitor has an actual viewable area of 20.1 inch (51 cm).
 In a more significant case, some monitors such as the Dell UltraSharp UP3216Q (3840×2160 px) are advertised as a 32 inch "class" monitor (137.68 PPI), but the actual viewing area diagonal is 31.5 inches, making the true PPI 139.87.

Calculating PPI of camera view screens 
Camera manufacturers often quote view screens in 'number of dots'.  This is not the same as the number of pixels, because there are 3 'dots' per pixel – red, green and blue. For example, the Canon 50D is quoted as having 920,000 dots.  This translates as 307,200 pixels (×3 = 921,600 dots).  Thus the screen is 640×480 pixels.

This must be taken into account when working out the PPI. 'Dots' and 'pixels' are often confused in reviews and specs when viewing information about digital cameras specifically.

Scanners and cameras 
"PPI" or "pixel density" may also describe image scanner resolution. In this context, PPI is synonymous with samples per inch. In digital photography, pixel density is the number of pixels divided by the area of the sensor. A typical DSLR, circa 2013, has 1–6.2 MP/cm2; a typical compact has 20–70 MP/cm2.

For example, Sony Alpha SLT-A58 has 20.1 megapixels on an APS-C sensor having 6.2 MP/cm2 since a compact camera like Sony Cyber-shot DSC-HX50V has 20.4 megapixels on an 1/2.3" sensor having 70 MP/cm2. The professional camera has a lower PPI than a compact camera, because it has larger photodiodes due to having far larger sensors.

Smartphones 
Smartphones use small displays, but modern smartphone displays have a larger PPI rating, such as the Samsung Galaxy S7 with a quad HD display at 577 PPI, Fujitsu F-02G with a quad HD display at 564 PPI, the LG G6 with quad HD display at 564 PPI or – XHDPI or Oppo Find 7 with 534 PPI on 5.5" display – XXHDPI (see section below). Sony's Xperia XZ Premium has a 4K display with a pixel density of 807 PPI, the highest of any smartphone as of 2017.

Named pixel densities 

The Google Android developer documentation groups displays by their approximate pixel densities into the following categories:

Metrication 

The digital publishing industry primarily uses pixels per inch but sometimes pixels per centimeter is used, or a conversion factor is given.

The PNG image file format only allows the meter as the unit for pixel density.

Image file format support 

The following table show how pixel density is supported by popular image file formats. The cell colors used do not indicate how feature-rich a certain image file format is, but what density support can be expected of a certain image file format.

Even though image manipulation software can optionally set density for some image file formats, not many other software uses density information when displaying images. Web browsers, for example, ignore any density information. As the table shows, support for density information in image file formats varies enormously and should be used with great care in a controlled context.

See also 
 Dots per inch
 Computer monitor DPI standards – the origins of 96 DPI/PPI as Microsoft/Windows standard and 72 DPI/PPI as (former) Apple/Macintosh standard
 Dot pitch
 Resolution independence
 Apple Retina display 
 Samsung PenTile

References 

Digital imaging
Density
Digital photography
Engineering ratios